Perla may refer to:

Places
Perla, Arkansas, a town in the United States
Perla, Kasaragod, a village in Kerala
Perła, Lesser Poland Voivodeship, a village in Poland
Perla gas field, a offshore gas field in Venezuela

People
Perla (singer) (born 1952), Paraguayan-Brazilian singer
Perla Batalla (born 1961), Mexican-American singer

Other uses
Perla (stonefly), a genus of stoneflies in the family Perlidae
Perla (zarzuela), an 1871 zarzuela by Miguel Marqués; verse libretto by Juan José Herranz 
Perła, Polish title of Edyta Górniak's album Invisible
Perła, a beer made by Browary Lubelskie
Italian submarine Perla
Perla-class submarine, Italian 1930s
Perla (TV series), Mexican

See also
—includes several people with forename Perla
—includes several people with surname or forename Perla
La Perla (disambiguation)
Perlla (born 1988), Brazilian singer
PERRLA and PERLA, medical abbreviations